Duchy of Poznan may refer to:
Duchy of Poznań, 12th–14th century
Grand Duchy of Posen, 1815–1848